Motor Vehicle Manufacturers Association v. State Farm Mutual Automobile Insurance Co., 463 U.S. 29 (1983), is a United States Supreme Court decision concerning regulations requiring passive restraints in cars. In it, the Court struck down an order by the National Highway Traffic Safety Administration rescinding regulations that required either airbags or automatic seat belts in new cars.

It held that the same arbitrary and capricious standard for reviewing agency actions applied to rescind regulations as that to enact regulations. It also held that the rescission of the rule requiring some sort of passive restraint was arbitrary and capricious because it failed to consider the alternative of requiring all cars to have airbags. Finally, it held that the agency had too quickly dismissed the safety benefits of automatic seat belts.

The case is noteworthy not only for its effects on car safety but also in clarifying the Court's approach to reviewing agency actions under the Administrative Procedure Act.

Background 
The National Traffic and Motor Vehicle Safety Act of 1966 directs the National Highway Traffic Safety Administration (NHTSA) to issue safety standards that "shall be practicable, meet the need for motor vehicle safety, and be stated in objective terms.". The resulting regulations went through a tumultuous history, with over 60 rulemaking notices having been amended, rescinded, reimposed, and then re-rescinded.

The original rulemaking simply mandated seat belts. However, that soon proved to be ineffective, as more than half of people never wore their seat belt during that time period. The NHTSA proposed using passive restraint systems, devices that would protect drivers even if drivers took no action other than that necessary to drive the car. The two main proposed mechanisms were automatic seat belts and airbags. In 1969, the NHTSA proposed a standard requiring installation of some kind of passive restraint for drivers, which was later amended to include all front seat passengers. The regulations adopted required passive restraints for vehicles built after 1975 and allowed those built between 1973 and 1975 to use a system in which the car would start only if the seatbelt was in use.

This "ignition interlock" option proved unpopular and resulted in Congress passing the Motor Vehicle and Schoolbus Safety Amendments of 1974, which disallowed ignition interlocks and required restraint systems other than seat belts to be approved by congressional resolution before going into effect.

In 1976, the optional alternatives were extended indefinitely by Secretary of Transportation William T. Coleman Jr., and the passive restraint requirement suspended because of expected public resistance. They were then reinstated by Coleman's successor, Brock Adams, and then they were re-rescinded by his successor, Andrew L. Lewis Jr. The last rescission is the action that the Supreme Court reviewed.

The NHTSA justified the rescission by saying that there was no longer sufficient evidence for the efficacy of the regulations. That was because of not a change in judgment about the technology but a change in car manufacturers' plans. Whereas the NHTSA originally estimated that 40% of new cars would have automatic seat belts, it turned out that 99% of cars would use them. In addition, they were going to use a detachable type of automatic seat belt, which could easily be detached, when they would operate like normal seat belts. The NHTSA also worried that the change would be expensive and sour the public's view towards safety regulations, as it would be seen as a wasteful, imposing example of bureaucratic overreach.

Though the DC Circuit found that rescinding a rule has "parallels" to failing to act and agency's failure to act was subject to only "very narrow" review, thus suggesting a narrow review in the case of rescission, it still vacated the rescission partially because of congressional action in response to NHTSA regulations, which it saw as heightening the standard of review. It gave the following reasons for vacating the rescission: there was insufficient evidence to sustain the conclusion that it could not predict an increase in seat belt usage and "only a well-justified refusal to seek more evidence could render rescission non-arbitrary," the NHTSA had inadequately considered the possibility of requiring nondetachable automatic seat belts, and it had inadequately considered the possibility of requiring airbags.

Decision 
Justice White, writing for the majority, disagreed with the DC Circuit and held that the scope of judicial review is the same for rescission as it is for enacting regulations in the first place. The Supreme Court explicitly rejected the view that it should treat rescission the same as a refusal to regulate in the first place: "The Motor Vehicle Safety Act expressly equates orders 'revoking' and 'establishing' safety standards; neither that Act nor the APA suggests that revocations are to be treated as refusals to promulgate standards."

It also rejected the view that the congressional action, after the enactment of the National Traffic and Motor Vehicle Safety Act, had affected the standard of review even if it could inform the Court's interpretation of the statute.

However, the Court agreed with the DC Circuit that the rescission was arbitrary and capricious for failing to consider the possibility of requiring airbags. Although agencies need not consider every possible alternative, requiring air bags was an obvious option since that was part of the original regulations. The fact that the car companies, which "waged the regulatory equivalent of war" against airbags, would try to evade the regulations was not a reason to repeal them. The Court also refused to consider rationales that the NHTSA raised in court but had failed to raise in the original order.

Although the Court considered this a "closer issue," it held the rescission to be also arbitrary and capricious, based on the dismissal of automatic seat belts' effectiveness.

Concurring opinion 
In a concurrence, Justice Rehnquist defended agencies that changed their minds on policy issues because of a changing political climate. He noted that the NHTSA's change of heart on safety regulations likely reflected the election of President Ronald Reagan but defended that as a reason for agency reconsideration of previously-adopted rules:

Arbitrary and capricious review 
The decision is notable for laying out the Supreme Court's interpretation of arbitrary and capricious review, also known as "hard look" review, as set out by the Administrative Procedure Act:

Legacy
After this Supreme Court case many cars sold in the United States began to have airbags in them, and also this case became a precedent to help justify legislation requiring seat belt usage among drivers and passengers in many states which became numerous in the 1980s and early 1990s.

References

Further reading 
 
 
Wiseman, A., & Wright, J. (2020). "Chevron, State Farm, and the Impact of Judicial Doctrine on Bureaucratic Policymaking." Perspectives on Politics

External links
 

United States Supreme Court cases
United States administrative case law
United States statutory interpretation case law
1983 in United States case law
State Farm
United States Supreme Court cases of the Burger Court